Ranis-Ziegenrück is a Verwaltungsgemeinschaft ("collective municipality") in the district Saale-Orla-Kreis, in Thuringia, Germany. The seat of the Verwaltungsgemeinschaft is in Ranis.

The Verwaltungsgemeinschaft Ranis-Ziegenrück consists of the following municipalities:

References

Verwaltungsgemeinschaften in Thuringia